Carl S. Burtness (April 30, 1882 – April 22, 1954) was an American businessman and politician.

Burtness was born in Wilmington Township, Houston County, Minnesota. He went to Breckinridge Institute in Decorah, Iowa and to University of Minnesota Farm School. Burtness lived in Caledonia, Minnesota with his wife and family. He was a farmer and was involved with the insurance business. Burtness served as the Wilmington Township Clerk for twenty-one years. He also served in the Minnesota House of Representatives from 1943 to 1950. He died at Lutheran Hospital in La Crosse, Wisconsin.

References

1882 births
1954 deaths
People from Caledonia, Minnesota
University of Minnesota alumni
Businesspeople from Minnesota
Farmers from Minnesota
Members of the Minnesota House of Representatives